Daniel Jiménez Briones  (born 3 December 1983) is a Costa Rican professional midfielder currently playing for Uruguay de Coronado.

Club career
A much-travelled midfielder, Jiménez played started his career at Santos de Guápiles and played for 8 other clubs in the Costa Rican football league. In summer 2012 he joined Carmelita. but he returned to San Carlos in January 2013.

International career
He made his debut for Costa Rica in a January 2008 friendly match against Iran and his second and final international was a January 2010 friendly match against Argentina.

References

External links
 
 League stats – Nación

1983 births
Living people
Association football midfielders
Costa Rican footballers
Costa Rica international footballers
Santos de Guápiles footballers
Brujas FC players
A.D. Carmelita footballers
C.S. Cartaginés players
Municipal Pérez Zeledón footballers
A.D. San Carlos footballers